Kintarō Yokoyama (横山 金太郎 Yokoyama Kintarō, b. Dec. 14, 1868-d. Sept. 25, 1945) was mayor of Hiroshima from 1935 to 1939.

1868 births
1945 deaths
Mayors of Hiroshima